Simon Le Borgne (21 December 1937 – 28 August 1997) was a French racing cyclist. He rode in the 1963 Tour de France.

Major results
1961
 1st  Overall Tour de l'Aude
1st Stage 1
 1st Maël-Pestivien
 1st Stage 2 Tour du Nord

References

External links
 

1937 births
1997 deaths
French male cyclists
Sportspeople from Quimper
Cyclists from Brittany